Rameshwar Singh Kashyap (16 August 1927 – 20 October 1992) was a Bhojpuri playwright, screenwriter and professor of Hindi at Patna University. He is best known for his Bhojpuri play Loha Singh which was gained immense popularity on Radio in 1970s. He was awarded the Padma Shri in 1991.

Life

Early life and education 
Kashyap was born in 1927 in Semra, a village in Sasaram of Bihar. His father, Rai Bahadur Janaki DSP in British Government and his mother was Ramasakhi Devi. He started in early education in Navgachia in Munger district of Bihar and also completed his Matriculation from Munger Town school. He completed his Bachelor of Arts in 1948 and Master of Arts in 1950 from Patna University and later became the professor of Hindi at B.N. College in Patna University, later he became professor of a college in Arrah and also retired from there.

Career 
His career as a writer started in 1942, his first Hindi composition was published in monthly journal Kishor in Patna. Later he got popularity for his writing like Bhojpuri play Loha Singh. In 1960s his Bhojpuri short story Machhri was published in the April edition of weekly journal Anjor. In 1991 he was honoured with Padma Shree award.

Death 
He died in 1992 due to diabetes.

Filmography

 He starred as Loha Singh in the movie Loha Singh based on his play.

Works 

 Loha Singh
 Tasalwā Tor ki Mor 
Nilkantha Nirala
Prabhat Varnan (Poem)
 Machhari (Short Story)

Awards

 Padma Shri, in 1991 in the field of literature.

References 

1927 births
1992 deaths
Bhojpuri-language writers
Indian dramatists and playwrights
Indian screenwriters
Academic staff of Patna University
20th-century Indian screenwriters